Amos Montague Hill (21 June 1910 – 1973) was an English professional footballer who played in the Football League for Lincoln City and Mansfield Town.

References

1910 births
1973 deaths
English footballers
Association football forwards
English Football League players
Lincoln City F.C. players
Mansfield Town F.C. players